A Maccabi or Maccabee is one of the Maccabees, a group of Jewish rebel warriors who controlled Judea.

Maccabi or Maccabee may also refer to:

People
 Bruce Maccabee, an American optical physicist
 Judas Maccabeus or Judah Maccabee, leader of the Maccabean Revolt

Other
 Maccabi (sports) or Maccabi World Union, international Jewish sports association
 List of Maccabi sports clubs and organisations
 Maccabi Sherutei Briut, an Israeli Health Maintenance Organization
 Maccabi youth movement, a Zionist youth movement established in 1929
 Maccabim-Re'ut, a former local council in central Israel
 Operation Maccabi, a 1948 military operation
 Maccabee (beer), produced by Tempo Beer Industries

See also
 Maccabees (disambiguation)
 Maccabeus (disambiguation)
 Maccabiah (disambiguation)